The Suriname national under-17 football team is the national under-17 football team of Suriname and is overseen by the Surinaamse Voetbal Bond and its represents Suriname in international Under 17 or youth football competitions.

History

Current squad
The following players are called up for the 2023 CONCACAF U-17 Championship.

Fixtures and results
legend

2019

Competition records

FIFA U-17 World Cup

CONCACAF U-17 Championship

References

Under-17
Caribbean national under-17 association football teams
South American national under-17 association football teams